Hit-Monkey (known officially as Marvel's Hit-Monkey for the first season), is an American adult animated television series created by Will Speck and Josh Gordon for the streaming service Hulu, based on the Marvel Comics character of the same name. The series is produced by Marvel Television for its first season and 20th Television Animation for its second season, with Gordon and Speck serving as showrunners.

The series stars Ally Maki, Olivia Munn, Fred Tatasciore, and Jason Sudeikis, with Nobi Nakanishi and George Takei joining for the first season, and Leslie Jones in the second. Hit-Monkey was announced and ordered at Hulu in February 2019, as part of a group of series based on Marvel characters that were intended to lead to a crossover special titled The Offenders, with it being produced by Marvel Television. Oversight of the series was moved to Marvel Studios in December 2019 when Marvel Television was folded into that company. 20th Television Animation produced the second season.

Hit-Monkey was released on Hulu on November 17, 2021. The series was met with generally positive reviews from critics for its animation, voice acting, action scenes, plot, and faithfulness to the source material of the comics. In February 2023, the series was renewed for a second season.

Plot
Hit-Monkey is a wronged Japanese macaque who is mentored by the ghost of an American assassin named Bryce Fowler as he damages Tokyo's crime underworld. Hit-Monkey and Bryce then travel to New York City.

Cast

Main

 Ally Maki as Haruka, a good honest cop who wants to fight the injustice in Tokyo.
 Olivia Munn as Akiko Yokohama, the smart and ambitious niece of Shinji.
 Nobi Nakanishi as Ito (season 1), Haruka's partner who has problems, but trusts Hit-Monkey.
 Fred Tatasciore as Hit-Monkey, a Japanese macaque.
 George Takei as Shinji Yokohama (season 1), a kind politician with a lot on his shoulders.
 Jason Sudeikis as Bryce Fowler (né McHenry), Hit-Monkey's mentor who dies and comes back to aid him as a ghost.
 Leslie Jones (season 2)

Guest
 Reiko Aylesworth as Maki Matsumoto / Lady Bullseye, a terrifying assassin who kills without remorse or hesitation.
 Aylesworth also voices Yuki, a spirit tied to Japan who sees Hit-Monkey as a true warrior.
 Noshir Dalal as Fat Cobra, a large sumo assassin who can produce lightning from his feet.
 Dalal also voices Kenuichio Harada / Silver Samurai, Japan's biggest hero who is also very conceited.

Episodes

Production

Development 
In February 2019, it was announced that Marvel Television was developing an adult animated television series based on Hit-Monkey, with a series order at Hulu, along with M.O.D.O.K. and ones based on Tigra and Dazzler together, as well as Howard the Duck, that were intended to lead up to a crossover special titled The Offenders. The series was created by Will Speck and Josh Gordon, both of whom were expected to write for the series and executive produce alongside Jeph Loeb. In December 2019, Marvel Television was folded into Marvel Studios, which carried subsequent oversight of the series. The following month, Marvel decided not to move forward with Howard the Duck, Tigra & Dazzler, and The Offenders, with M.O.D.O.K. and Hit-Monkey continuing as planned. In May 2021, M.O.D.O.K. co-creator Jordan Blum revealed that the series would have a different animation style from M.O.D.O.K.. In January 2022, Hulu's head of content Craig Erwich stated that additional seasons of Hit Monkey would be determined solely by the Marvel Studios team. With the cancelation of M.O.D.O.K. in May 2022, Variety reported Hit-Monkey was also not expected to be renewed. However, the series was renewed in February 2023, with 20th Television Animation taking over production of the series, given Marvel Television no longer existed. Additionally, the series no longer featured "Marvel's" in its name, though the Marvel logo would still be attached to the series "in other ways".

Casting
In September 2021, it was revealed that Jason Sudeikis would voice Bryce, along with Fred Tatasciore as Hit-Monkey, with George Takei, Olivia Munn, Ally Maki, and Nobi Nakanishi also starring. Tatasciore, Sudeikis, Munn, and Maki return for the second season, with Leslie Jones joining the cast.

Release 
Hit Monkey was released on November 17, 2021, on Hulu in the United States. Internationally, the series was released on January 26, 2022, on Disney+ (via Star), Disney+ Hotstar and Star+ in Latin America.

Reception
The review aggregator website Rotten Tomatoes reports an 84% approval rating with an average rating of 7.0/10 based on 19 critic reviews. The website's critical consensus reads: "If Marvel's Hit-Monkey is never as thrillingly original as its title might suggest, vibrant animation and a solid voice cast keep things consistently watchable." Metacritic, which uses a weighted average, assigned a score of 57 out of 100 based on 6 critics, indicating "mixed or average reviews".

Kristen Reid of Paste stated that the animation of Hit-Monkey is remarkable with its inspiration of Japanese animation, and claimed that the level of violence and lack of morality is refreshing compared to the Marvel Cinematic Universe, while finding the sense of humor of the series entertaining despite its lack of originality. Brenton Stewart of Comic Book Resources found Hit-Monkey unique and refreshing through its animation compared to other high-quality Marvel productions, stating that the company should continue to provide more adult animated projects that take risks. Stephen Robinson of The A.V. Club gave the series a A− rating, stating that Hit-Monkey manages to be one of the best recent Marvel TV shows created, while the animation and the development of the villains, and complimenting the performance and chemistry of the cast. Siddhant Adlakha of IGN rated the series 7 out of 10 and found the animation of the series impressive, complimented how the plot and the visual elements manage to balance between humor and gore, despite saying that the characters feel more American than Japanese through their dialogues and mannerism. John Townsend of Starburst rated the series 3 out of 5 stars, saying that Marvel Television successfully provides a show with an inventive and clever humor, making less-known Marvel characters likable.

References

External links 
 
 
 

2020s American adult animated television series
2020s American animated comedy television series
2020s American comic science fiction television series
2020s American superhero comedy television series
2021 American television series debuts
Adult animated television shows based on Marvel Comics
American adult animated comedy television series
American adult animated science fiction television series
American adult animated superhero television series
American comic science fiction television series
Animated television series about ghosts
Animated television series about monkeys
Anime-influenced Western animated television series
English-language television shows
Hulu original programming
Television series by Fox Television Animation
Television series by Marvel Studios
Television series by Marvel Television
Television shows set in Japan
Television shows set in New York City
Television shows set in Tokyo
Works about the Yakuza